The tax on childlessness was imposed in the Soviet Union and other Communist countries, starting in the 1940s, as part of their natalist policies. Joseph Stalin's regime created the tax in order to encourage adult people to reproduce, thus increasing the number of people and the population of the Soviet Union. The 6% income tax affected men from the age of 25 to 50, and married women from 20 to 45 years of age.

The tax remained in place until the collapse of the Soviet Union, though by the end of the Soviet Union, the amount of money which could be taxed was steadily reduced. Minister of Health Mikhail Zurabov and Deputy Chairman of the State Duma Committee for Health Protection Nikolai Gerasimenko proposed reinstating the tax in Russia in 2006, but so far it has not been reinstated.

Soviet Union 
As originally passed and enforced from 1941 to 1990, the tax affected most childless men from 25 to 50 years of age, and most childless married women from 20 to 45 years of age. The tax was 6% of the childless person's wages, but it provided certain exceptions: those with children that died during World War II did not have to pay the tax, nor did war heroes that received certain awards. Also, many students were able to obtain an exemption from the tax, as did people who earned less than 70 rubles a month. Furthermore, those who were medically incapable to give birth were also exempt to this tax, and many single men fraudulently escaped the tax by claiming infertility and provided fake medical documentation.

After 1990, the income exemption was increased to 150 rubles, meaning that the first 150 rubles of income for childless adults went untaxed. In 1991, the tax was changed to no longer apply to women, and in 1992, it was rendered irrelevant and inactive due to the collapse of the Soviet Union.

Poland
In 1946, communist Poland introduced a similar increase of the basic income tax rate, in effect a tax on childlessness, popularly called bykowe in Polish ("bull's tax", the "bull" being a metonymy for an unmarried man). First, childless and unmarried people over 21 years of age were affected (from 1 January 1946 till 29 November 1956), then only over 25 years of age (30 November 1956 till 1 January 1973).

Romania

Taxes on childlessness were part of the natalist policy introduced by Nicolae Ceaușescu in Communist Romania in the period 1967-1989. Along with the outlawing of abortion and contraception  (1967) and  mandatory gynecological revisions, these taxes were introduced in various forms in 1977 and 1986. Unmarried citizens had to pay penalty for childlessness, the tax income rate being increased by 8-10% for them.

China 
Previously, the fine is so-called "social maintenance fee" and it is the punishment for the families who have more than one child. According to the policy, the families who violate the law may bring the burden to the whole society. Therefore, the social maintenance fee will be used for the operation of the basic government.

Effects and proposals
During the Soviet Union, Russia had a higher fertility rate than it did in the years after the fall of the Soviet Union, prompting some Russian leaders to propose bringing back the tax on childlessness. According to the Health Ministry, the total fertility rate dropped from 2.19 children/woman to 1.17 children/woman in the aftermath of the Soviet Union. According to the Russian Director of the Center for Demography Anatoliy Vishnevskiy, this birth rate is among the lowest in the world, and Russian leaders have described the demographic issues in Russia as being symptomatic of a "crisis".

While the tax on childlessness has not been re-enacted, other proposals have been. For example, Vladimir Putin enacted a proposal to provide cash incentives for women who are willing to have a second child.

In 2018, a childless tax was proposed in China to counter their own birth rate issues.

In Germany, Minister for Health Jens Spahn called for childless tax, saying that those without children should pay much more towards care and pension insurance than those who have started a family.

See also

 Bachelor tax
 Birth dearth
 Child benefit
 Childlessness
 Demographic transition
 Decreței
 Family in the Soviet Union
 One-child policy
 Population planning
 Reproductive rights
 Russian Cross
 Two-child policy
 Three-child policy

References

Demographics of the Soviet Union
Taxation in the Soviet Union
Natalism
Abolished taxes
Taxes promoting marriage and reproduction
Discrimination against LGBT people